Mark "Traa" Daniels (born December 30, 1970) is the bass guitarist of the San Diego rock band P.O.D. He has been a member since 1993 and has performed on all of the band's official records. The band has released thirteen albums – Snuff the Punk, Brown, Payable on Death Live, The Fundamental Elements of Southtown, Satellite, Payable on Death, Testify, Greatest Hits: The Atlantic Years, When Angels & Serpents Dance, Murdered Love, SoCal Sessions, The Awakening, and Circles. Traa is married and has two children, and as a bassist, has a jazz and funk background.

In 2005, Daniels signed an endorsement deal with Warrior, to produce a signature bass guitar designed to his specifications. Traa is also the president of a production company known as Ryot Entertainment. The company has teamed up with SteelRoots. He is the manager of the alternative band The Wrecking. He originally comes from Cleveland, Ohio.

Discography

P.O.D.

Snuff the Punk (1994)
Brown (1996)
The Fundamental Elements of Southtown (1999)
Satellite (2001)
Payable on Death (2003)
Testify (2006)
When Angels & Serpents Dance (2008)
Murdered Love (2012) 
SoCal Sessions (2014)
 The Awakening (2015)
 Circles (2018)

References

1970 births
Living people
American heavy metal bass guitarists
American male bass guitarists
African-American guitarists
African-American rock musicians
African-American Christians
California Republicans
American performers of Christian music
Alternative metal bass guitarists
21st-century American bass guitarists
21st-century American male musicians
20th-century American bass guitarists
20th-century American male musicians
20th-century African-American musicians
21st-century African-American musicians
P.O.D. members